Halenbeck-Rohlsdorf is a municipality in the Prignitz district, in Brandenburg, Germany.

Demography

References

Localities in Prignitz